The 1992 Victorian state election was held on 3 October 1992.

Retiring Members

Labor
John Cain MLA (Bundoora)
Steve Crabb MLA (Knox)
Robert Fordham MLA (Footscray)
Andrew McCutcheon MLA (St Kilda)
Max McDonald MLA (Whittlesea)
Terry Norris MLA (Dandenong)
Jim Simmonds MLA (Reservoir)
Neil Trezise MLA (Geelong North)
Joan Coxsedge MLC (Melbourne West)
George Crawford MLC (Jika Jika)
Giovanni Sgro MLC (Melbourne North)
Evan Walker MLC (Melbourne)

Liberal
Tom Austin MLA (Ripon)
David Lea MLA (Sandringham)
Lou Lieberman MLA (Benambra)
Alan Hunt MLC (South Eastern)
Robert Lawson MLC (Higinbotham)
Dick Long MLC (Gippsland)
Reg Macey MLC (Monash)

National
Bruce Evans MLA (Gippsland East)
Ken Wright MLC (North Western)

Legislative Assembly
Sitting members are shown in bold text. Successful candidates are highlighted in the relevant colour. Where there is possible confusion, an asterisk (*) is also used.

Legislative Council
Sitting members are shown in bold text. Successful candidates are highlighted in the relevant colour. Where there is possible confusion, an asterisk (*) is also used.

References

Psephos - Adam Carr's Election Archive

Victoria
Candidates for Victorian state elections